Coxe is a surname, and may refer to:

Alfred Conkling Coxe Sr., American federal judge
Alfred Conkling Coxe Jr., American federal judge
Arthur Cleveland Coxe, American bishop, son of Samuel Hanson Cox
Cameron Coxe, Welsh footballer
Daniel Coxe, English governor of West Jersey
Eckley Brinton Coxe, Pennsylvania Mining Company Owner, State Senator
Henry Coxe, English scholar
Hopewell Coxe, American politician
 Coxe, also known as John Coxe, was an adopted name of Naukane, a 19th-century Hawaiian labourer for the North West and Hudson's Bay Companies
John Coxe (MP) (c1695–1783), English politician
Louis O. Coxe, American poet
Tench Coxe, early American economist and politician
William Coxe, English historian

See also
 Cock
 Cocks
 Cox
 Coxen
 Coxon